Follow the Sun is the fourth studio album by Evermore, which was released on 12 October 2012. The album was partly recorded using a portable studio during a world trip. Two singles, "Follow the Sun" and "Hero", have been released.

Tour
The band embarked on a short Australian tour in anticipation of the new album, as well as appearing as a support act for Maroon 5's Australian tour.

Track listing

Bonus tracks

Personnel
 Jon Hume – lead vocals, electric and acoustic guitars, ukulele, piano, drums, percussion, production
 Peter Hume – bass guitar, piano, keyboards, vocals, mandolin, ukulele, accordion, acoustic guitar
 Dann Hume – electric and acoustic guitars, vocals, drums, percussion, piano

Charts

References

2012 albums
Evermore (band) albums